West Sound was an independent local radio station in Ayrshire, launched in 1981 broadcasting on AM and FM from their studio complex in Ayr.  Through mergers and acquisitions, the station slowly lost its local identity and is now broadcast from studios in Clydebank, Glasgow.  It’s  AM transmitter is outside Symington, South Ayrshire and its DAB transmitter in Darvel, East Ayrshire, the transmitters now broadcast Bauer's Greatest Hits Radio network.

As of September 2022, the station weekly audience has dwindled to only 64,000 listeners according to RAJAR.[1]

The station is due to be rebranded to Greatest Hits Radio Ayrshire on 3 April 2023, but with no content being actually originated in the county.

Programming
All of the programming is carried from Greatest Hits Radio's network of locally branded Scottish stations with some off-peak output also carried from GHR's sister network in England.

Networked programming originates from the studios of Clyde 2 in Clydebank, Forth 2 in Edinburgh, Tay 2 in Dundee and from Greatest Hits Radio's Birmingham, Nottingham, London and Manchester studios. Occasional programming is produced and broadcast from MFR 2 in Inverness, Northsound 2 in Aberdeen and West Sound in Ayrshire and Dumfries and Galloway

News
Westsound broadcasts local news bulletins hourly from 6am to 7pm on weekdays and from 7am to 1pm at weekends. Headlines are broadcast on the half hour during weekday breakfast and drivetime shows, alongside sport and traffic bulletins.

National bulletins from Sky News Radio are carried overnight with bespoke networked Scottish bulletins at weekends, produced from Radio Clyde's newsroom in Clydebank.

Presenters

Ewen Cameron (Ewen & Cat At Breakfast)

Cat Harvey (Ewen & Cat At Breakfast)

Paul Carlin (Ewen & Cat At Breakfast, Saturday Afternoon)

Stuart Webster (Weekday Daytime)

Keith Clarkson (Sunday Breakfast)

Alan Edwards (Afternoon Anthems, Home Run and Saturday Breakfast)

Andy Crane (Late Night)

Alex Lester (Weekday Overnights)

Mark Goodier (Greatest Hits Superstars, Smash Hits Chart Show)

Des Paul (Rhythm Of The Night)

Tony Dibbin (Weekend Overnight)

Gavin Pearson (Saturday Morning)

Paul Gammobachini (America's Greatest Hits)

Kate Thornton (House Party)

Boogie (Boogie Nights)

Fred MacAulay (Sunday Morning)

Simon Mayo (The Album Show)

Arlene Stuart (Sunday Evening)

References

External links
 

Bauer Radio
Greatest Hits Radio
Radio stations in Scotland
Radio stations established in 1981